Adreana "Adi" Braun (born  November 23, 1962) is a Canadian jazz and cabaret vocalist and composer.

Adi Braun was born and brought up in Germany. Her family is musical: her parents were professional singers (her father was Victor Braun), and her brother, Russell, is also a singer. She has cited Judy Garland, Barbra Streisand, and Lotte Lenya as influences. After moving to Canada, Braun graduated in music from the University of Toronto, then became involved in the jazz scene in the city. She co-founded Blue Rider Records in the early 2000s. In English, she "sings with a slight German accent".

Discography
 Delishious (Blue Rider, 2003)
 The Rules of the Game (Blue Rider, 2005)
 Live at the Metropolitan Room (Blue Rider, 2008)
 Canadian Scenes 1 (Blue Rider, 2010)
 Moderne Frau (Blue Rider, 2017)

References

External links
 Official site

1962 births
Living people
Musicians from Toronto
Cabaret singers
Canadian women singers